Madre mía gracias por los días is the debut album by the hardcore band Xibalba, originally released in 2010 by the band itself and Beatdown Hardware Records. Later, re-released on June 21, 2011 by A389 Recordings and Southern Lord Recordings.

Track listing

 Originally released as part of Earthquake compilation and recorded at Young Bros Studios. Also produced by Xibalba not Ben Hammerstrom.

Personnel
Xibalba
Nate Rebolledo - vocals
Brian Ortiz - electric guitar
Jensen Hucle - electric guitar, acoustic guitar
Jason Brunes - drums
Bryan Valdivia - bass

Production
Alex Estrada - mastering
Ben Hammerstrom - producer

References

2010 debut albums
Xibalba (band) albums